Anita Sharma is an Indian politician from Uttarakhand representing the Indian National Congress. In the 2018 Haridwar Municipal Corporation election, she was elected Mayor of Haridwar with a margin of 3,467 votes.

References 

Indian National Congress politicians from Uttarakhand
Living people
Year of birth missing (living people)
Women mayors of places in Uttarakhand